Center for Resource Solutions (CRS) is a nonprofit organization based in the Presidio in San Francisco, California. It works to promote the retail renewable energy market in the United States by developing consumer-protection programs in renewable energy, greenhouse gas reductions, and energy efficiency. Founded in 1997 by Jan Hamrin, CRS administers the Green-e Climate, Green-e Energy, and Green-e Marketplace certification programs.

External links 
 Center for Resource Solutions website
 Green-e website
 Renewable Energy Markets conference website

References 

Non-profit organizations based in San Francisco
Organizations established in 1997